John Reginald Rhodes (September 26, 1929 – September 25, 1978) was a broadcaster and politician from Sault Ste. Marie, Ontario. He was a Progressive Conservative member of the Legislative Assembly of Ontario from 1971 to 1978. He died while still in office on a trip to the Middle East in 1978.

Background
Rhodes was born in Sault Ste. Marie, Ontario, the son of John Francis Rhodes, and educated there. In 1955, he married Vivian Louise Shook. Rhodes was a popular radio and television personality on CJIC in the 1960s.

Politics
Rhodes was elected to Sault Ste. Marie City Council, and was mayor from 1969 to 1971.

Rhodes was elected as an MPP in the 1971 provincial election as the Progressive Conservative candidate in the riding of Sault Ste. Marie. served in the Legislative Assembly of Ontario. In 1974 he was appointed to cabinet as the Transportation and Communications. As Minister of Transportation he opposed a seat belt law and helmets for moped drivers. As minister he allowed the paving of the Spadina Expressway from Lawrence to Eglinton.

In October 1975 he was shuffled to the Minister of Housing. In January 1978 he was moved to the Minister of Industry and Tourism.

He died in Tehran, Iran in 1978. He had just arrived from Cairo, Egypt, after attending trade talks when he experienced a massive heart attack. He was 48 years old. Both opposition leaders lauded Rhodes after learning of his death. Liberal Stuart Smith called Rhodes "one of the ablest and warmly human members." New Democrat Michael Cassidy said, he was an "engaging fellow who played the political game with an enormous amount of gusto. He enjoyed respect from all sides of the house."

Cabinet positions

Legacy
He was named posthumously to the Sault Ste. Marie Walk of Fame in September 2007. The John Rhodes Community Centre in Sault Ste. Marie, Ontario was also named after him. The John Rhodes Community Centre is a facility for hosting sporting events and other tourism related activities. Algoma University also presents an annual scholarship named in Rhodes' memory. In 1981, the John. R. Rhodes Driver Examination Centre in Malton, Ontario was opened. It was demolished in 2004 and moved to nearby Brampton, Ontario.

References

External links 

1929 births
1978 deaths
Mayors of Sault Ste. Marie, Ontario
Members of the Executive Council of Ontario
Progressive Conservative Party of Ontario MPPs